The 1994 African Judo Championships were the first edition of the African Judo Championships, organised by the African Judo Union and were held in Tunis, Tunisia in 1994.

References

External links
 

African Championships
African Judo Championships
1994 in African sport